Harborside station is a station on the Blue Line of the San Diego Trolley located in the Logan Heights neighborhood of San Diego. It serves the Logan Heights residential neighborhood as well as a nearby industrial area.

History

This station was renovated, starting September 26, 2013, as part of the Trolley Renewal Project; it reopened with a renovated station platform in mid August 2014.

Station layout
There are two tracks, each with a side platform.

See also
 List of San Diego Trolley stations

References

Blue Line (San Diego Trolley)
Railway stations in the United States opened in 1981
1981 establishments in California
San Diego Trolley stations in San Diego